Nico Klein (born 4 January 1930) is a Luxembourgian former sports shooter. He competed in the 50 metre pistol event at the 1968 Summer Olympics.

References

External links
 

1930 births
Possibly living people
Luxembourgian male sport shooters
Olympic shooters of Luxembourg
Shooters at the 1968 Summer Olympics
People from Rambrouch